James Michael Bennett (born February 9, 1996) is an American actor. He is known for his roles as a child actor in Daddy Day Care, Hostage, The Amityville Horror, Poseidon, Evan Almighty, Orphan, Shorts, and as young James T. Kirk in the 2009 film Star Trek. He also starred on the ABC series No Ordinary Family as JJ Powell, a teenager gifted with vast intelligence after a plane crash.

Life and career
Bennett was born on February 9, 1996, in Seal Beach, California, and lives with his parents and sister in Huntington Beach, California, where the family runs a hard rock-themed crêpe restaurant. Bennett also plays guitar and sings on his official YouTube channel. He also wrote and performed the song "Summer Never Ends", which can be heard at the end of Shorts.

Bennett appeared in nearly 30 television advertisements, as well as in episodes of the television series The Guardian and Strong Medicine, before being cast in the role of "Tony", the boy who wants to be The Flash, in the Eddie Murphy comedy Daddy Day Care. He had smaller roles in the films Anchorman: The Legend of Ron Burgundy and Arthur Hailey's Detective, and also appeared in Judging Amy, CSI: Crime Scene Investigation and Everwood, and lent his voice to characters in the animated films The Polar Express, The Jungle Book 2, Winnie the Pooh: Springtime with Roo and I Want a Dog for Christmas, Charlie Brown. He has been nominated for Young Artist Awards five times.

In August 2011, Bennett released his debut single "Over Again" and the accompanying music video.

Sexual assault allegations against Asia Argento
According to documents obtained by The New York Times, a $380,000 settlement was made between Bennett and actress Asia Argento after Bennett claimed that Argento sexually assaulted him in a California hotel room in 2013, when he was 17 and Argento was 37. Bennett said that after the encounter he began to feel "extremely confused, mortified, and disgusted". 

Bennett's lawyer wrote that in the years after the incident, Bennett was so traumatized that his job performance, income, and mental health declined. They first met when Bennett played Argento's son in the 2004 film The Heart Is Deceitful Above All Things when Bennett was seven years old. He notified Argento that he intended to sue in November 2017, shortly after she went public with rape accusations against Harvey Weinstein. Argento countered that Bennett "sexually attacked" her, and that her partner Anthony Bourdain had arranged to pay $380,000 as part of the settlement.

Bennett and his lawyer, Gordon Sattro, are working with a Los Angeles County Sheriff's investigation regarding the claims of sexual assault against Argento.

Filmography

Awards and nominations

References

External links
 
 

1996 births
Living people
21st-century American male actors
American male child actors
American male film actors
American male television actors
American male voice actors
Male actors from Orange County, California
People from Seal Beach, California